Beauty in Distress is a 1698 tragedy by the English writer Peter Anthony Motteux.

The original Lincoln's Inn Fields cast included Thomas Betterton as Don Vincentio, John Verbruggen as Ricardo, Edward Kynaston as Duke Ferdinand, John Hodgson as Fabiano, Elizabeth Barry as Laura, Anne Bracegirdle as Placentia and Henrietta Moore as Morella.

References

Bibliography
 Lowerre, Kathryn. Music and Musicians on the London Stage, 1695-1705. Routledge, 2017.
 Watson, George. ''The New Cambridge Bibliography of English Literature: Volume 2, 1660-1800. Cambridge University Press, 1971.

1698 plays
English plays
West End plays
Tragedy plays